"The Ketchup Song (Aserejé)" is the debut single by Spanish pop group Las Ketchup, taken from their debut studio album Hijas del Tomate (2002). The song is about a young man who enters a nightclub while singing and dancing. In addition to the original Spanish version, the song exists in a form with Spanglish verses, although the nonsensical chorus is identical in both versions.

"The Ketchup Song" was released on 10 June 2002 and became an international hit the same year. It reached number one in at least 20 European countries and became the best-selling hit of 2002 in eight of them. It also topped the music charts of Australia, Canada, and New Zealand but stalled at number 54 in the United States. In Central and South America, the song became a number-one airplay hit. As of 2006, the song had sold over seven million copies worldwide. The song's dance routine was a popular novelty dance in the early 2000s.

Background

Las Ketchup was first introduced to Columbia Records through Shaketown Music, a small record label in Córdoba, Andalusia, who sent out the group's demo to a number of different record companies. The demo featured the songs "Asereje" and "Kusha Las Payas". When A&R Javier Portugués and Columbia director Raúl López listened to the demo, they stared at each other in delight exclaiming, "Wow, this is fantastic!" At first the intention was to arrange a distribution deal with ShakeTown Music but upon hearing the song they realised its international potential and so negotiated for Las Ketchup to sign with Sony.

Composition
The song is written in the key of E♭ minor and has a tempo of 94 beats per minute, in cut time. It follows the chord progression of E♭m–D♭–C♭–A♭m–B♭7 in the chorus. The pre-chorus uses an altered chord (B minor), or a modal interchange, as the cadence. According to Pandora.com, the song features "mixed acoustic and electric instrumentation, humorous lyrics, and electric guitar riffs".

Content

"The Ketchup Song" is about a young man named Diego who enters a nightclub. The DJ, a friend of Diego's, plays Diego's favorite song, "Rapper's Delight" by the Sugarhill Gang, and Diego dances and sings along to the song, imitating its chorus with Spanish gibberish.

"Aserejé" is, therefore, a meaningless word, with the chorus "" being a somewhat incorrect imitation of the Rapper's Delight's "I said a hip-hop, the hippie the hippie to the hip hip hop ..."

Dance routine
For the first dance move, the hands must be held open facing down and continuously waving them over another two times for six beats. The second involves tossing the thumb over the shoulder twice, right before spinning one's arm around each other while raising from the waistline to face level. The last move of the dance involves placing the back of one's hand on the forehead and the palm of the other hand on the back of the head while knocking one's knees together a couple of times.

Critical reception
Andy Thomas from Drowned in Sound gave the song a 9 out of 10, stating, "The Ketchup Song is better than the Macarena...", while acknowledging that the song is "not smart, it's not clever, and it's not going to get a single positive review outside of the teeny bop press." Thomas described the song's band members (Las Ketchup) as "three slightly odd-looking women from Spain who are the proud exponents of this year's Macarena. It's got dance moves (wiggle your hands, thumb a lift, raise your arms, knock your knees together) and a sunny video where the trio serve drinks in a beach bar."

Commercial performance
The song reached number one in every country it charted except for the United States, where it peaked at number 54 on the Billboard Hot 100. In France, the song reached number one for 11 weeks and eventually sold 1,310,000 copies, making it the best-selling single of 2002, and the second-best-selling of the 21st century in the country, behind "Un Monde parfait" by Ilona Mitrecey. Furthermore, the song was the 50th best-selling single of the 2000s in the UK. The song was a radio hit in Central and South America, topping the airplay charts of Argentina, Chile, Colombia, Ecuador, Peru, and Venezuela.

Music video
The music video was shot at Palm Beach, Estepona in Spain, at Chiringuito bar. Two other music videos were also produced for the song.

The main video starts with the female band members laying out a carpet on the ground and putting the bar stools on display to set up their musical show. They then serve people exotic beverages at the beach bar. A male bar attendant enthusiastically pours a drink in a glass and juggles a bottle around. Meanwhile, more and more beach-goers are shown drawn into the bar, to watch the trio's performance. In some shots of the video, the trio would be performing near wooden window frames which are laid individually on the sandy beach.

During the song's chorus, the band members perform their signature dance moves, alongside other visitors who also joyously participate. The band are helped up to a table, where they execute their Aserejé dance in front of a larger, jubilant crowd who gleefully jive in to the dance. By the end of the video, the crowd becomes jam-packed, with the young and old dancing to the song near the beach bar.

Controversy
Although the band has explained that "aserejé" is a meaningless word derived from "Rapper's Delight", rumors and conspiracy theories spread through e-mail, especially in Latin America, that the gibberish lyrics included hidden demonic references that would lead the listener to Satanism and heresy.

The phrases from the Spanish lyrics which were claimed to be references to Satanism include:

 "", which can be broken down into the Spanish phrase "", meaning "let's be heretical".
 "" – "Ja" would here be the beginning of the Tetragrammaton referring to Jehova (God). The phrase would therefore be "" ("Jehova (God), let go of your being").
 "" ("where there isn't room for a soul"), supposedly referring to hell.
 "" ("the DJ who knows him plays the midnight anthem"), supposedly referring to Satanic rituals which occur at midnight.

A Dominican television station banned the song.

Track listings

Charts

Weekly charts

Year-end charts

Decade-end charts

All-time charts

Certifications and sales

Release history

Rouge version

"Ragatanga" is a song by the Brazilian girl group pop Rouge. It is an adapted version in Portuguese of "The Ketchup Song". Columbia Records and Sony released "Ragatanga" on 31 August 2002, only in Brazil and Portugal in the same year as the original, as the second single from the group's self-titled debut studio album (2002). It was among the most successful songs of that year in Brazil and is Rouge's most successful song, and there were records that the song reached to play more than fifteen times a day on Brazilian radio stations.

Background and composition
In selecting the tracks for the group's debut album, Liminha went to a meeting with Sony representatives from around the world and commented that he needed a repertoire for a group that would release in Brazil, receiving the song "Asereje" from Spain. The song, however, nearly did not make it to the album. "The list of songs was ready when I heard about 'Ragatanga'", said Alexandre Schiavo, vice president of marketing for Sony Music Brasil.

Hence, Rick Bonadio made a version and transformed it into "Ragatanga", whose chorus, "Aserehe ra de re De hebe tu de hebere seibiunouba mahabi", does not mean anything, according to Schiavo. In Schiavo's explanation, it is the crap that people who do not know English usually sing. "The thing that Las Ketchup teenagers invented", he says. Bonadio says: "The secret of a good version is to have fidelity to the original, not to try to invent". The Brazilian version has a mix of Spanish and Portuguese since it counts on the participation of Las Ketchup.

Commercial performance
"Ragatanga" became a viral success in Brazil, winning the charts quickly. The song reached the first position of the radios, remaining for 11 consecutive weeks in the first place.

Legacy
"Ragatanga" was a resounding hit in Brazil, making Rouge not only popular in Brazil, but in some other parts of the world. The single was taken as the song that boosted sales of the band's first album. In two months in the stores, the album reached the mark of 730,000 sold copies and became favorite to the title of commercial champion of 2002. Besides, the song did not leave the top of the charts. The song was also considered as the reason for the tickets for the group's debut concert on 14 November 2002, at ATL Hall in Rio de Janeiro, to be sold out. By that time, the album had already reached the mark of 950,000 copies.

Billboard magazine ran a photo story of Rouge in the October 2002 issue. The report showed production details, a crossover of hits on the radio, and talks a little about the first tour they did for Brazil. In addition to talking about the hits "Ragatanga" and "Não Dá pra Resistir", he also spoke about the international career, in which Rouge performed in Argentina with great success, and the intention to launch the group's CD in Chile and Peru.

Music video
On 31 August 2002, the music video for "Ragatanga" premiered. The video for "Ragatanga" is simple, counting on the girls dancing the choreography of the song, on a giant stage, while the lyrics of the chorus are displayed in the clip. The participation of the band Las Ketchup in the video clip is obtained from the original music video. The choreography was also imported from Spain, but according to the girls, "We added a new movement, which is the sign of asking for a ride."

Track listing
CD single
 "Ragatanga (Aserejé)" (Album Version)	
 "Ragatanga (Aserejé)" (Radio Edit)	
 "Ragatanga (Aserejé)" (Memê's Da Carnival Beat Remix)	
 "Ragatanga (Aserejé)" (Cuca Rnb Mix)

CD single (Remixes)
 "Ragatanga (Aserejé)" (Memê's Summer Heat Mix) – 4:09
 "Ragatanga (Aserejé)" (Da Carnival Beat Mix) – 4:09

Charts

Covers and other versions
In 2012, singer Kelly Key made a cover of the song, for the collection Festa Kids (2012). The re-recording was harshly criticized by Internet users for making the song "bland". In 2013, in a concert held in a nightclub in São Paulo, singer Wanessa summoned Li Martins, to sing some songs, among them "Ragatanga". Still in 2013, the song "Ramón" by girl band Girls (formed and produced by the same producer of Rouge, Rick Bonadio), included in the first studio album of the band, was compared to "Ragatanga" due to its Latin rhythm and the protagonist of the song, which is already being considered the new Diego. The song was also covered in Japanese by the girl group, Soltomatina.

See also
 List of Romanian Top 100 number ones of the 2000s

References

2000s fads and trends
2002 debut singles
2002 songs
Brazilian songs
Canadian Singles Chart number-one singles
Columbia Records singles
Conspiracy theories
Dutch Top 40 number-one singles
European Hot 100 Singles number-one singles
Irish Singles Chart number-one singles
Las Ketchup songs
Line dances
Novelty songs
Number-one singles in Australia
Number-one singles in Austria
Number-one singles in the Czech Republic
Number-one singles in Denmark
Number-one singles in Finland
Number-one singles in Germany
Number-one singles in Greece
Number-one singles in Hungary
Number-one singles in Italy
Number-one singles in New Zealand
Number-one singles in Norway
Number-one singles in Portugal
Number-one singles in Romania
Number-one singles in Scotland
Number-one singles in Spain
Number-one singles in Sweden
Number-one singles in Switzerland
Portuñol songs
Rouge (group) songs
SNEP Top Singles number-one singles
Songs about dancing
Songs about hip hop
Songs about music
Sony Music singles
Spanglish songs
Spanish songs
UK Singles Chart number-one singles
Ultratop 50 Singles (Flanders) number-one singles
Ultratop 50 Singles (Wallonia) number-one singles